Black Pistons Motorcycle Club is the official support club for the Outlaws Motorcycle Club, another group of motorcycle enthusiasts. Established in Neuwied, Germany October 2001 with the idea generating from the Koblenz Outlaws, the Black Pistons have expanded rapidly throughout the U.S., Canada, Europe and Asia. The Black Pistons have an estimated 70 domestic chapters in 20 US states and an unknown number of international chapters in Belgium, Canada, Germany, Great Britain, Norway, Ireland, Philippines, Japan, Russia, France, Hong Kong, Thailand and Poland. The exact number of Black Pistons members is unknown but the figure is estimated to be more than 600 in the U.S. The Outlaws use the Black Pistons chapters as a recruitment source for prospective Outlaws members

United States
March 5th of 2002 a club called Satan's Syndicate of Columbus, Ohio became the first Black Pistons MC in the U.S. Several of the original members have also stepped up to become Outlaws.

Soon after the patch over of Satan's Syndicate a second Black Pistons chapter opened in Ocala, Florida.

There are over 70 chapters throughout the United States.

References

Outlaw motorcycle clubs
2002 establishments in Germany
Motorcycle clubs in Germany
Outlaws Motorcycle Club